Narayan Lal Panchariya (born 10 August 1954) is a Rajya Sabha Member of Parliament in Rajasthan. He was elected to Rajya Sabha in the 2014 election. He lives in the Jodhpur district in Rajasthan.

References

https://india.gov.in/my-government/indian-parliament/narayan-lal-panchariya

1954 births
Living people
Bharatiya Janata Party politicians from Rajasthan
People from Jodhpur district
Rajya Sabha members from Rajasthan